Zacorisca leura is a species of moth of the family Tortricidae first described by Józef Razowski in 2013. It is found on Seram Island of Indonesia. The habitat consists of upper montane forests.

The wingspan is about 32 mm. The basal third of the forewings is whitish, gradually suffused creamish brown towards the middle. The remaining posterior part of the wing is brownish, finely tinged with brown at the costa. The hindwings are pale brownish, with an orange rust admixture.

Etymology
The specific name refers to the colouration of the forewings and is derived from Greek leuros (meaning smooth).

References

Moths described in 2013
Zacorisca